Kazımabad is a village and municipality in the Jalilabad Rayon of Azerbaijan.  It has a population of 2,254.

References 

Populated places in Jalilabad District (Azerbaijan)